Monte Montona is a low mountain in the western part of the island of São Vicente, Cape Verde. Its elevation is 242 m. It is situated 4 km northeast of São Pedro and 6 km southwest of the island capital Mindelo.

References

Mountains of Cape Verde
Geography of São Vicente, Cape Verde